The Jaguar F-Pace (X761) is a  compact luxury crossover SUV made by Jaguar Land Rover, a British car manufacturer, under their Jaguar marque. It is the first model to be built by Jaguar in the SUV class. It was formally announced at the 2015 North American International Auto Show in Detroit, with sales commencing in 2016 following an unveiling at the International Motor Show Germany in Frankfurt in September 2015. The design of the F-Pace is based on the 2013 Jaguar C-X17 concept car. The 2017 Jaguar F-PACE has been named the honorary winner of the 2017 World Car of the Year and World Car Design of the Year Awards at the New York International Auto Show.

The F-Pace is built at Jaguar Land Rover's Solihull plant along with the Range Rover Velar and employs an additional 1,300 workers.

Launch
An F-Pace production prototype made its public debut on 4 July 2015, by leading out the Team Sky professional cycle racing team during Le Grand Départ in Utrecht, Netherlands at the start of the 2015 Tour de France. The car made its official public début at the September 2015 Frankfurt Motor Show. Ahead of the Frankfurt Motor Show, an F-Pace, driven by professional stunt driver Terry Grant, performed a world-record-breaking 360 degree loop-the-loop. Customer deliveries started in April 2016 in Europe and in May 2016 in the United States.

Engines
The F-Pace is offered with the Jaguar Land Rover Ingenium 2.0L turbocharged Diesel and 2.0L petrol turbocharged engines, available in the Prestige, Portfolio and R-Sport specifications, while the 3.0L turbocharged diesel (except USA) and supercharged petrol are available in the S and First Edition specifications. The F-Pace is offered in both RWD and AWD variants.

Transmission
F-Pace models are equipped with the same ZF 8HP eight-speed automatic transmission as other D7a platform vehicles, a lighter variant of the gearbox currently fitted to other Jaguar models. A six-speed ZF manual gearbox is available on the lower-powered diesel models.

Exterior

Ian Callum was the exterior designer for the F-Pace. The body structure comprises 80 per cent aluminium, and additional weight savings come from the composite tailgate and magnesium for parts such as the cross-car beam. 
The body's high torsional stiffness enables the F-TYPE-derived double-wishbone front suspension and sophisticated Integral Link rear suspension to perform even better. Together with Torque Vectoring as standard and an Electric Power Assisted Steering system tuned to give the best possible feel and response.

Chassis

The F-Pace chassis is the third model to be built on Jaguar Land Rover's iQ-Al (D7a) modular platform, which is used for the XE, the second generation XF, and the Velar. The design features double wishbone suspension at the front, with similarities to the system fitted to the XF and F-Type models, the rear features an entirely new subframe mounted multi-link suspension system, named by Jaguar as Integral Link. This system is a more costly combination to manufacture but allows for greater tuning to provide a good balance between handling and ride quality.

Interior
The interior of the F-Pace features several existing Jaguar design cues, including the rotary gear selector which rises when the car is started. The central console, when equipped with the upgraded InControl Touch Pro system, features a  touch screen allowing access to in-car entertainment, satellite navigation and various vehicular settings, such as the G-Meter and engine/gear shift/steering/suspension parameters. Navigation can also be shown full-screen, in 3D on an additional 12.3-inch HD virtual instrument cluster. The F-Pace features smartphone connectivity with Wifi Hotspot and some models allow the owner to control the vehicle remotely, pre-heating the interior or unlocking the car using a smartphone application.
The F-Pace is also the first vehicle in Jaguar's range to feature the Activity Key, a waterproof wrist band that unlocks the F-Pace allowing the main keys to be left inside, thus preventing possible water damage.

Worldwide sales 

2016 sales are for a partial year only. Even so, it became the best selling Jaguar model in 2016.

References

External links

YouTube video of the world-record loop-the-loop

F-Pace
Mid-size sport utility vehicles
Luxury sport utility vehicles
Crossover sport utility vehicles
Cars introduced in 2016
2020s cars